Bhaisani Islampur is a village in Shamli district, Uttar Pradesh, India.

Villages in Shamli district